José Kanté Martínez (born 27 September 1990) is a professional footballer who plays as a forward for J.League club Urawa Red Diamonds. Born in Spain, he represented the Guinea national team internationally.

Club career
Born in Sabadell, Province of Barcelona, Catalonia, Spain, Kanté only played lower league or amateur football in his country of birth initially, representing CE Manresa, UE Rubí, AE Prat (all in his native region) and Atlético Malagueño. He scored his first goal in the Segunda División B while at the service of the third club, in a 2–1 away win against CF Badalona on 11 November 2012.

In June 2014, Kanté signed with Cypriot First Division side AEK Larnaca FC, where he shared teams with a host of compatriots. He played his first top-flight game on 31 August of that year, coming on as a second-half substitute in the 0–2 home loss to APOEL FC.

Kanté moved to the Polish Ekstraklasa in January 2016, going on to remain several years in the country with Górnik Zabrze and Wisła Płock. In the 2016–17 season he scored ten goals, helping to a final ninth-place finish.

On 18 June 2018, Kanté signed for Legia Warsaw in the same league. The following 31 January, he joined Gimnàstic de Tarragona on loan for the remainder of the campaign in the Segunda División.

Kanté terminated his Legia contract by mutual consent on 23 February 2021. On 10 March, he moved to Kazakhstan Premier League club FC Kairat on a deal until December 2022, but left four months after it expired.

On 27 August 2022, Kanté joined Cangzhou Mighty Lions F.C. on a free transfer. On 24 September, in his third appearance and first start in the Chinese Super League, he scored all of his team's goals in a 4–3 victory over leaders Wuhan Three Towns FC, which ended the opponent's 17-game unbeaten run since getting promoted the previous season.

International career
Of Guinean descent, Kanté opted to represent that nation even though he did not speak French nor any of the local dialects when he was first summoned by manager Kanfory Lappé Bangoura in November 2016. He earned his first cap on the 13th, playing 25 minutes in a 1–2 home defeat against DR Congo for the 2018 FIFA World Cup qualifiers.

Career statistics

Scores and results list Guinea goal tally first, score column indicates score after each Kanté goal.

References

External links

1990 births
Living people
Spanish people of Guinean descent
Guinean people of Spanish descent
Citizens of Guinea through descent
Spanish sportspeople of African descent
Sportspeople from Sabadell
Spanish footballers
Guinean footballers
Footballers from Catalonia
Association football forwards
Segunda División players
Segunda División B players
Tercera División players
CE Manresa players
UE Rubí players
AE Prat players
Atlético Malagueño players
Gimnàstic de Tarragona footballers
Cypriot First Division players
AEK Larnaca FC players
Ekstraklasa players
Górnik Zabrze players
Wisła Płock players
Legia Warsaw players
Kazakhstan Premier League players
FC Kairat players
Chinese Super League players
Cangzhou Mighty Lions F.C. players
Guinea international footballers
2019 Africa Cup of Nations players
2021 Africa Cup of Nations players
Spanish expatriate footballers
Guinean expatriate footballers
Expatriate footballers in Cyprus
Expatriate footballers in Poland
Expatriate footballers in Kazakhstan
Expatriate footballers in China
Spanish expatriate sportspeople in Cyprus
Spanish expatriate sportspeople in Poland
Spanish expatriate sportspeople in Kazakhstan
Spanish expatriate sportspeople in China